The Connecticut Brakettes is a women's fastpitch softball team based in Stratford, Connecticut. The team has won many state, regional, national, and international tournaments (28 ).

History 

The team was founded in 1947 by William S. Simpson as the Raybestos Girl All-Stars.  Over the years the team name has changed to Raybestos Brakettes (1948), Hi-Ho Brakettes, Stratford Brakettes, or Connecticut Brakettes (2006).  The Brakette name is derived from the main product of the Raybestos plant in Stratford which produced brake linings for automobiles and trucks.

In 2006 the Brakettes fielded two teams.  The Connecticut Brakettes were members of National Pro Fastpitch (NPF), finishing second in the regular season with a record of 27–15.  In the NPF championship game, the Connecticut Brakettes lost to the fourth place New England Riptide 2–0.  In 2006 they also fielded the Stratford Brakettes in the Amateur Softball Association (ASA).  They won the 2006 women's major fastpitch tournament held in Amherst, New York.

The Brakettes dropped out of the NPF league in 2007 but still competes as an amateur team in the women's major division of the Amateur Softball Association (ASA).

Highlights of the Brakettes' seasons include:

Players 
Notable Brakette players have included:

 Shirley Topley (born April 14, 1934) played 1963–1964 with the Brakettes, coached the Orange, California Lionettes, was inducted into the national hall of fame in 1981.
 E. Louise "Lou" Albrecht (born November 19, 1934) played 1969 with the Brakettes, was inducted to the national hall of fame in 1985.
 Rosemary "Micki" Macchietto Stratton (born July 12, 1938) played 1956–1965 and was elected to the national hall of fame in 1969.
 Joan Joyce (born 1940) played 1954–1963 and 1967–1975 (19 seasons) for the Brakettes, was inducted into the National Softball Hall of Fame and Museum in 1983, the International Softball Federation Hall of Fame in 1999, and has been coach of the Florida Atlantic University softball team since its founding.
 Billie Moore (born May 5, 1943) played 1969–1972 with the Brakettes, went on to become an accomplished Olympic and college basketball coach.
 Donna Lopiano (born 1946) played 1965–1972 with the Brakettes, also played at the first ISF Women's World Championship in Melbourne, Australia in 1965. Inducted to the Hall of Fame in 1983.
 Sharron Backus (born February 12, 1946) played 1969–1975 with the Brakettes, was inducted to the national hall of fame in 1985, and was head coach of softball at UCLA from 1975 to 1997 which included 9 wins of the Women's College World Series.
 Bertha Ragan Tickey played 1956–1968 with the Brakettes, was inducted into the national hall of fame in 1972.
 Peggy Kellers (born March 19, 1948) played 1964–1974 for the Brakettes, was softball coach at the University of Virginia 1993–1997, and was inducted to the National Hall of Fame in 1986.
 Patty Harrison played 1964–1972 with the Brakettes, was inducted into the national hall of fame in 1976.
 Kathryn "Sis" King played 1965–1967 with the Brakettes, was inducted into the national hall of fame in 1975.
 Wiltraud "Willie" Roze (born November 8, 1948) played 1965–1975 and was elected to the national hall of fame in 1985.
 Rose Marie "Rosie" Adams (born August 22, 1951) played 1971–1974 and was elected to the national hall of fame in 1987.
 Sue Tomko (born July 1953) played 1971–1974
 Barabara Reinalda (born February 13, 1957) played 1976–1994 with the Brakettes, was inducted into the national hall of fame in 1999.
 Dot Richardson (born 1961) played 1984–1994 for the Brakettes then went on to win a gold medal in the 1996 Olympic games, and was inducted into the Hall of Fame in 2006.
 Sheila Cornell-Douty (born 1962) played 1988–1994 for the Brakettes then went on to win gold medals in the 1996 and 2000 Olympic games, and was inducted into the National Hall of Fame in 2006, and the ISF Hall of Fame in 2007.
 Diane "Schuie" Schumacher played 1976–1986 with the Brakettes, was the head coach of the Netherlands women's national softball team in 1987, was inducted into the national hall of fame in 1992 and the ISF hall of fame in 1993.
 Gina Vecchione (born 1965) played 1978–1989, has coached at UCLA, UC Berkeley, and Oregon State University; was inducted into the national hall of fame in 1997.
 Kathy Arendsen played 1978–1992 was elected to the national hall of fame in 1996 and the ISF hall of fame and the Michigan Sports Hall of Fame both in 2003.
 Pat Dufficy played 1977–1983, 1985–1995, 1997 (19 seasons) with the Brakettes, was inducted into the national hall of fame in 2005.
 Lisa Fernandez (born 1971) played in the 1990 through 1994 seasons with the Brakettes, three time Olympic gold medalist.
 Courtney Blades (born 1978) pitched one 5 game tournament in 2000, including a perfect game.
 Kelly Kretschman (born 1979) played in the 2003 and 2006 seasons.
 Cat Osterman (born 1983) played in the 2001, 2002, and 2005 seasons.
 Andrea Duran (born 1984) played in the 2006 season and went on to win a gold medal in the 2006 ISF World Championship and a silver medal in the 2008 Olympics.
 Katie Burkhart (born 1986) played in the 2007 season.

Coaches 
Brakette coaches have included:

 Bernie Kaplan 1947–1956 seasons
 Vin Cullen 1957–1961
 Vincent "Wee" Devitt (April 10, 1912 – March 17, 1988) Brakette manager 1962–1967, also Raybestos Cardinal manager and National Softball Hall of Fame and Museum member.
 Ralph Raymond 1968–1994 – two-time Olympic team coach (1996, 2000) and Hall of Fame manager
 John Stratton 1995–present

Stadia 
The Brakettes played from 1947 through 1987 at Raybestos Memorial Field near the center of the town of Stratford.  In 1974 Raybestos Memorial hosted the ISF Women's World Championship in which the United States beat Japan for the gold medal.  Starting in the 1988 season they played at a field that was originally built in 1966 and has been known as Avco Lycoming Field, Textron Lycoming Field, AlliedSignal Field, and was renamed Frank DeLuca Hall of Fame Field in 1997. Frank "Hooks" DeLuca was a pitcher for the men's slowpitch team sponsored by Avco Lycoming in Stratford who was inducted into the National Softball Hall of Fame in 1974. In addition to the Brakettes, DeLuca Field is home to the Stratford Breakers and Stratford Seahawks softball teams, the Stratford High School girls' softball team, the Stratford Police Athletic League girls' softball teams, the Men's Industrial Slow Pitch League, and the 
Stratford Recreation Department Slow Pitch League games.

References

External links 
 Connecticut Brakettes
 Frank DeLuca Hall of Fame Field is at 

Softball teams
Stratford, Connecticut
Sports clubs established in 1947
Sports teams in Connecticut
1947 establishments in Connecticut